Calinan is a district of Davao City in the Philippines, which in 2020  had a population of 24,218. It is a 3rd class district that is situated in Davao del Sur.
The district is known for production of cacao beans. Calinan is also the centre of Davao City.

Barangays
Calinan is divided into 19 barangays.
 
Biao Joaquin
Calinan Proper
Cawayan
Dacudao
Dalagdag
Dominga
Inayangon
Lacson
Lamanan
Lampianao
Megkawayan
Pangyan
Riverside
Saloy
Sirib
Subasta
Talomo River
Tamayong
Wangan

See also 
Davao City
Holy Cross College of Calinan
Districts of Davao City

References 

Geography of Davao del Sur